The White River Bridge is a five span Warren deck truss bridge located near Beaver, Carroll County, Arkansas. The bridge was built in 1950-52 by the Forcum-James Company of Dyersburg, Tennessee. It was the last of eleven deck-truss bridges built in the state, and is the only one of its type in the county.

The bridge was listed on the National Register of Historic Places in 2008.

See also
 US 62 Bridge over Crooked Creek
 List of bridges on the National Register of Historic Places in Arkansas
 National Register of Historic Places listings in Carroll County, Arkansas

References

 
 
 

Road bridges on the National Register of Historic Places in Arkansas
Transportation in Carroll County, Arkansas
U.S. Route 62
National Register of Historic Places in Carroll County, Arkansas
Bridges of the United States Numbered Highway System
Warren truss bridges in the United States
1952 establishments in Arkansas
Bridges completed in 1952